The 20th Vietnam Film Festival was held from November 24 to November 28, 2017, in Ho Chi Minh City, Vietnam, with the slogan "Building a modern and humane film industry" (Vietnamese: "Xây dựng nền công nghiệp điện ảnh hiện đại và nhân văn").

Event 
The 20th Vietnam Film Festival reunites with the coastal city of Da Nang after 29 years since the 8th Vietnam Film Festival (1988). And for the first time in the history of the Vietnam Film Festival, the Feature Film category was absent from the state film line.

This festival has a number of changes, such as removing the direct-to-video feature film category because it is outdated; established the ASEAN Film Awards to honor works in the region. 10 countries in Southeast Asia have brought to the festival international award-winning films, enriching this playground.

4 Golden Lotus awards were given in each category: Feature, Documentary, Science and Animated, along with the Best Film in ASEAN Film Awards. This year, the award for the most favourite film voted by the audience were only for Panorama Program.

Participation 
The cinematographic works participating in the 20th Vietnam Film Festival must be Vietnamese-language films produced by Vietnamese cinema establishments or in cooperation with foreign organizations and individuals and must be free from copyright disputes. Only films licensed from October 11, 2015, to September 10, 2017, will be registered. In special cases, the organizers will flexibly consider.

Remake films can compete and participate in all programs of the event, but cannot compete in the "Best Screenplay" and "Best Film" categories (the Lotus Award).

The Film Festival Selection Board has selected 129 films of all types, from 34 film production units across the country. There were 16 feature films, 26 documentaries, 17 scientific films and 18 animated films. In addition, there are 12 feature films and 10 documentaries in the program "Panorama Cinema". The film "Dạ cổ hoài lang" represents Vietnamese cinema to compete for the ASEAN Film Award. This year, the organizers do not prescribe specific points for each Golden Lotus and Silver Lotus awards. Judges will score from high to low to find the best work.

In addition, 20 films have made the history of Vietnamese revolutionary cinema, from "Chung một dòng sông" (1959), "Chị Tư Hậu" (1963), "Nổi gió" (1966) to "Tôi thấy hoa vàng trên cỏ xanh" (2015) will be screened to serve the audience during the festival. The audience will see once-loved films such as "Mẹ vắng nhà", "Vị đắng tình yêu", "Em bé Hà Nội", "Bao giờ cho đến tháng Mười", "Tướng về hưu", "Ngã ba Đồng Lộc", etc.

Jury 
There are 4 jury panels established at the 20th Vietnam Film Festival. In which, the jury of the ASEAN Film Awards operates independently from the other 3 panels.

The jury for the feature film category consists of 9 members:
Director Đặng Nhật Minh (Head)
Director Victor Vũ
Director Trần Lực
Screenwriter Trịnh Thanh Nhã
Cinematographer Đặng Phúc Yên
Film critic Tô Hoàng
Painter Vi Ngọc Mai
Composer Trần Mạnh Hùng
Actress Nhật Kim Anh

Documentary/science film jury has 8 members:
Director Lê Thi (Head)
Director Nguyễn Thước
Sound director Lê Huy Hòa
Director Huỳnh Văn Hùng
Director Nguyễn Trung Hiếu
Journalist Phạm Việt Tiến, Former Deputy General Director of Vietnam Television
Journalist Đinh Trọng Tuấn

Animated film jury has 5 members as follows:
Screenwriter, film critic Đoàn Minh Tuấn (Head)
Director Đào Minh Uyển
Animator Lê Thế Anh
Composer Doãn Nguyên
Journalist Ngô Minh Nguyệt

The 20th Vietnam Film Festival will host the ASEAN Film Awards (ASEAN FILM Awards). The award is organized at the initiative of Vietnam with the meaning of celebrating the 50th anniversary of the founding of ASEAN. With the theme "Cinema connects the ASEAN community", the award's criteria are towards excellent cinematographic works, filmmakers and cinematic artists with outstanding creativity in ASEAN; at the same time discovering and encouraging new talents of ASEAN cinema. Three prestigious film activists of South Korean, Hong Kong and Polish cinema have accepted to join the Awards Jury:
Director/producer Jonathan Hyong-Joon Kim (South Korea)
Screenwriter/producer Roger Garcia, Executive Director of Hong Kong International Film Festival
Director/screenwriter Karolina Bielawska (Poland)

Activities 
Before the film festival officially took place, on the evening of November 8, the film week to celebrate the 20th Vietnam Film Festival opened in Hanoi. The event is chaired by the Cinema Department, in collaboration with the National Cinema Center, and will be held from November 8 to November 14 in Hanoi and Ho Chi Minh City.

The festival also has many side activities such as:
Exhibition "Signature of Vietnam cinema through 20 periods of Vietnam Film Festival" (Vietnamese: “Dấu ấn Điện ảnh Việt Nam qua 20 kỳ Liên hoan Phim Việt Nam”)
Artists exchange with audience, students of Duy Tân University
Artists exchange with soldiers of armed forces, Đà Nẵng Military Command
Seminar "Vietnam Film Festival in the development of national cinema" (Vietnamese: “Liên hoan Phim Việt Nam trong sự nghiệp phát triển điện ảnh dân tộc”)
Seminar "The way to bring ASEAN cinema to the world" (Vietnamese: “Con đường đưa điện ảnh ASEAN ra thế giới”)

Films participating in the festival are screened for free at 3 cinemas Lê Độ, Galaxy Đà Nẵng and CGV Đà Nẵng.

Both of the opening and closing ceremonies took place at Trưng Vương Theater, 35A Phan Châu Trinh, Đà Nẵng City. The Opening Ceremony will be broadcast live on VTV2 at 20:00 on November 24. The Closing and Awards Ceremony were broadcast live on VTV1 at 20:00 on November 28.

Official Selection

Feature film

In Competition 

Highlighted title indicates Golden Lotus winner.

Panorama Program 

Highlighted title indicates the most favorite film voted by the audience.

ASEAN Film Awards 

Highlighted title indicates Best Film Award winner.

Awards

Feature film

Documentary/Science film

Documentary film

Science film

Animated film

ASEAN Film Awards

References 

Vietnam Film Festival
Vietnam Film Festival
Vietnam Film Festival
2017 in Vietnam
November 2017 events in Vietnam